KVRW (107.3 FM, "107.3 PopCrush") is a radio station broadcasting a top 40/CHR music format. Licensed to Lawton, Oklahoma, United States, the station serves the Lawton area. The station is currently owned by Townsquare Media and features programming from Westwood One.  Studios are located in downtown Lawton, and the transmitter is just west of the city.

History
On March 21, 2016, KVRW changed their format from classic hits (as "My 107.3") to contemporary hit radio (CHR), branded as "107.3 PopCrush".

References

External links

VRW
Contemporary hit radio stations in the United States
Lawton, Oklahoma
Radio stations established in 1992
1992 establishments in Oklahoma
Townsquare Media radio stations